Campbellton may refer to:

Places

Canada
 Campbellton, New Brunswick
 Campbellton, Newfoundland and Labrador
 Campbellton, Prince Edward Island

United States
 Campbellton, Florida
 Campbellton, Georgia
 Campbellton, Missouri
 Campbellton, Texas

Other uses
 Campbellton (Gerrardstown, West Virginia), a house on the National Register of Historic Places

See also
 Campbelltown (disambiguation)